Title II may refer to:

Patriot Act, Title II
Title II of the Communications Act of 1934
Title II of the Civil Rights Act of 1964
Title II of the Elementary and Secondary Education Act